Kaltental is a market town and municipality of Ostallgäu in Bavaria, Germany.

References

Ostallgäu